Alexei Nikolayevich Voropaev (born 23 January 1973 - died 5 November 2006) was a gymnast who competed for Russia in the two Olympic Games. He won gold medals in the 1992 and 1996 Olympic Games.

See also
List of Olympic male artistic gymnasts for Russia

External links
 

1973 births
2006 deaths
Soviet male artistic gymnasts
Russian male artistic gymnasts
Gymnasts at the 1992 Summer Olympics
Gymnasts at the 1996 Summer Olympics
Olympic gymnasts of the Unified Team
Olympic gymnasts of Russia
Olympic gold medalists for the Unified Team
Olympic gold medalists for Russia
Gymnasts from Moscow
World champion gymnasts
Medalists at the World Artistic Gymnastics Championships
Deaths from hepatitis
Olympic medalists in gymnastics
Medalists at the 1996 Summer Olympics
Medalists at the 1992 Summer Olympics
European champions in gymnastics